Jack Symons (19 July 1924 – 20 February 2015) was an Australian rules footballer who played with Essendon in the Victorian Football League (VFL).

Notes

External links 		

Jack Symons' obituary

1924 births
2015 deaths
Australian rules footballers from Victoria (Australia)
Essendon Football Club players